The women's sprint competition at the 2019  UEC European Track Championships was held on 17 and 18 October 2019.

Results

Qualifying
The top 8 riders qualified for the 1/8 finals, 9th to 24th places qualified for the 1/16 finals.

1/16 finals
Heat winners advanced to the 1/8 finals.

1/8 finals
Heat winners advanced to the quarterfinals.

Quarterfinals
Matches are extended to a best-of-three format hereon; winners proceed to the semifinals.

Semifinals
Winners proceed to the gold medal final; losers proceed to the bronze medal final.

Finals

References

Women's sprint
European Track Championships – Women's sprint